Chongxi is a town under the administration of Qiaojia County, Yunnan, China. , it administers Chongxi Residential Community and the following 11 villages:
Beifeng Village
Yangpeng Village
Gangou Village
Anjuka Village
Gonghe Village
Laowu Village
Mahong Village
Heyu Village
Huashan Village
Nantuan Village
Baimu Village

References 

Township-level divisions of Zhaotong
Qiaojia County